81st NYFCC Awards
January 4, 2016

Best Picture: 
Carol

The 81st New York Film Critics Circle Awards, honoring the best in film for 2015, were announced on December 2, 2015 and presented on January 4, 2016.

Winners

Best Film:
Carol
Best Director:
Todd Haynes – Carol
Best Actor:
Michael Keaton – Spotlight
Best Actress:
Saoirse Ronan – Brooklyn
Best Supporting Actor:
Mark Rylance – Bridge of Spies
Best Supporting Actress:
Kristen Stewart – Clouds of Sils Maria
Best Screenplay:
Phyllis Nagy – Carol
Best Animated Film:
Inside Out
Best Cinematography:
Edward Lachman – Carol
Best Non-Fiction Film:
In Jackson Heights
Best Foreign Language Film:
Timbuktu • MauritaniaBest First Film:
László Nemes – Son of Saul''
Special Award:
Ennio Morricone

References

External links
 2015 Awards

New York Film Critics Circle Awards
New York
2015 in American cinema
New
2015 in New York City